The Power of Darkness is an 1886 play by Leo Tolstoy.

The Power of Darkness may also refer to:

 The Power of Darkness (1909 film), a silent Russian film directed by Pyotr Chardynin
 The Power of Darkness (1924 film), a silent German film directed by Conrad Wiene
 The Power of Darkness (1979 film), an Argentine film directed by Mario Sábato

See also
 Power of Darkness, an album by Two Steps from Hell